Popasnoye is a rural locality (a selo) in Kursky Selsoviet, Kulundinsky District, Altai Krai, Russia. The population was 152 as of 2013. There is 1 street.

Geography 
Popasnoye is located 24 km southwest of Kulunda (the district's administrative centre) by road. Novopokrovka is the nearest rural locality.

References 

Rural localities in Kulundinsky District